The 2005 Speedway World Cup Event 2 was the second race of the 2005 Speedway World Cup season. It took place on August 2, 2005 in the Smedstadion in Eskilstuna, Sweden.

Results

Heat details

Heat after heat 
 ADAMS, Kasprzak, Lindback, Hefenbrock (d/start)
 PROTASIEWICZ, Jonsson, Sullivan, Schafer
 HOLTA, Rickardsson, Crump, Smolinski
 HAMPEL, Karlsson, Schields, Stange
 GOLLOB, Lindgren, Watt, Schultz
 RICKADRSSON, Schields, KAasprzak, Schultz
 KARLSSON, Protasiewicz, Watt, Hefenbrock
 ADANS, Lindgren, Holta, Schafer
 HAMPEL, Lindbaeck, Smolinski, Sullivan
 JONSSON, Crump, Gollob, Stange
 CRUMP (J), Kasprzak, Karlsson, Schafer
 SHIELDS, Lindgren, Protasiewicz, Smolinski
 HOLTA, Lindbaeck, Stange, Watt
 ADAMS, Hampel, Jonsson, Schultz
 GOLLOB, Rickardsson, Sullivan, Hefenbrock
 JONSSON, Watt, Kasprzak, Smolinski
 RICKADRSSON, Protasiewicz, Adams, Stange
 SULLIVAN, Karlsson, Schultz, Holta (Fx)
 HAMPEL, Crump, Lindgren, Hefenbrock
 GOLLOB, Lindgren, Shields, Schafer
 SULLIVAN, Lidngren, Kasprzak, Stange
 CRUMP, Lindgren, Schultz, Protasiewicz (e/3)
 JONSSON, Shields, Holta, Hefenbrock
 RICKADRSSON, Watt, Hampel, Schafer
 ADAMS, Gollob (J), Smolinski, Karlsson

References

See also 
 2005 Speedway World Cup
 motorcycle speedway

E2